Keep Laughing is an album by hardcore punk band Rich Kids on LSD, released in 1985. It was produced and engineered by Phillip (Philco) Raves at Mystic Studios in Hollywood.

Track listing

Credits

References

1985 albums
Rich Kids on LSD albums